Prospekt Slavy ( (Avenue of Glory) is a Saint Petersburg Metro station on the Frunzensko–Primorskaya Line (Line 5) of the Saint Petersburg Metro. It was opened on 3 October 2019 as a part of the extension of the line to the south from Mezhdunarodnaya. The extension also included Dunayskaya and Shushary stations. Prospect Slavy is located between Mezhdunarodnaya and Dunayskaya.

Prospekt Slavy is built under the corner of Bukharestskaya Street and Slavy Avenue, in Frunzensky District.

Transport 
Buses: 11, 54, 56, 57, 114, 116, 141, 157, 239, 241, 253, 282, 288. Trolleybuses: 26, 27, 29. Trams: 25, 43, 45, 49.

References 

Saint Petersburg Metro stations
Railway stations located underground in Russia
Railway stations in Russia opened in 2019